"Kissin U" is a song by American recording artist Miranda Cosgrove, released as the sole single from her debut studio album, Sparks Fly. Cosgrove co-wrote the song with Claude Kelly and Dr. Luke; the latter also co-produced it with Ammo. It was released on digital download format on March 22, 2010, and to mainstream radio on May 11, 2010. 

The song was well received critically and was a moderate chart success. The song is her first to enter the U.S. Mainstream Top 40 chart, where it peaked at number 19. The single peaked at number 54 on the Billboard Hot 100. It also charted in several international music charts, including Germany and Austria. The song appeared on the 2010 compilation album Now That's What I Call Music! 35.

Background
"Kissin U" was first announced in late February 2010. The single was previewed on Ryan Seacrest's radio show, On Air with Ryan Seacrest on March 12, 2010, and was released on digital download format on March 22, 2010. During an interview with MTV about the song, Cosgrove stated that

During the same interview, Cosgrove stated the song provided her with the inspiration to title her debut album Sparks Fly, saying that "The reason I ended up naming it Sparks Fly [is because] those are the first two words you hear when you pop my album in." The single was released for radio airplay on May 11, 2010. On June 29, 2010 a remix EP containing three remixes of the song was released for digital download.

Critical reception
Idolator.com praised the song and compared it to releases by Kesha, and noted that the song "is a zippy if cookie-cutter pop song—not terribly exciting or risky, but with enough listens you'll find yourself singing along with the chorus." Commonsensemedia  praised the song's "purely poppy sounds and Cosgrove's limitless enthusiasm" but was also critical of the song's lyrics.

The song ranked number eighty-eight on Bill Lamb's List of Top 100 Songs of 2010.

Commercial performance
"Kissin U" peaked at number 54 on the Billboard Hot 100. The song was also a top twenty hit on the US Mainstream Top 40 chart. On January 14, 2011, it was announced that "Kissin U" had been certified gold by RIAA for sales of over 500,000 units. The song peaked at number 67 in Germany and at number 51 in Austria.

Promotion and performances
Cosgrove performed "Kissin U" live at the Nickelodeon Kids' Choice Awards pre-show. On September 6, 2010, she performed "Kissin U" on Today.

Music video
The music video was shot in Santa Monica, California and debuted on March 19, 2010. It was directed by Alan Ferguson. The video shows Cosgrove on the beach singing and walking, to meet her love interest who is a sidewalk artist. They go to his house and she sees all the paintings he has painted, as well as trying to teach her how to draw, and later washing his car in front of her house, she splashes him with the hose and he chases her around the car. Later they are seen at a party where it seems they kiss. When she wakes up that morning she looks out the window to see a drawing of a butterfly with images of her and him in the wings on the sidewalk.

Track listing
Digital download
"Kissin U" – 3:18

CD and digital download (2-track)
"Kissin U" – 3:19
"Kissin U" (Mike Rizzo extended club remix) – 5:56

Digital download (remix EP)
"Kissin U" (Jason Nevins radio remix) – 3:11
"Kissin U" (Mike Rizzo radio remix) – 3:08
"Kissin U" (Smash Mode radio remix) – 3:22

Charts

Certifications

Release history

References

2009 songs
2010 singles
Miranda Cosgrove songs
Songs written by Dr. Luke
Songs written by Claude Kelly
Song recordings produced by Dr. Luke
Columbia Records singles
Songs written by Miranda Cosgrove
Music videos directed by Alan Ferguson (director)